Riley Mackey Odoms (born March 1, 1950) is an American former professional football player who was a tight end for the Denver Broncos of the National Football League (NFL). He played college football at the University of Houston, where he had a highlight year in 1971 with 45 catches for 730 yards and 8 touchdowns after playing sparingly the two seasons prior.

Odom played his entire NFL career with Denver. He was drafted fifth overall in the 1972 NFL Draft, which tied him with Mike Ditka for the highest drafted tight end ever in the NFL Draft. That record stood for 49 years until the 2021 NFL Draft, where Kyle Pitts was selected fourth overall.

Odoms was a four-time Pro Bowl selection and was a two-time All-Pro. He finished his career with 396 receptions for 5,755 yards and 41 touchdowns.

He is the grandson of Baseball Hall of Famer Biz Mackey.

References

External links

1950 births
Living people
People from Luling, Texas
American football tight ends
Houston Cougars football players
Denver Broncos players
American Conference Pro Bowl players